Kuehneosaurus is an extinct genus of Late Triassic kuehneosaurid reptile known from the Late Triassic (Norian stage) of the Penarth Group of southwest England and the Steinmergel Group of Luxembourg. Temperature at this stage and region would have ranged from 28 to 35 °C. It was named by P. L. Robinson in 1962 in honour of paleontologist Walther Kühn, and the type and only species is Kuehneosaurus latus. Measuring 72 centimetres long (2.3 feet), it had "wings" formed from ribs which jutted out from its body by as much as 14.3 cm, connected by a membrane which allowed it to slow its descent when jumping from trees. It is a member of a family of extinct gliding reptiles, the Kuehneosauridae, within a larger living group the Lepidosauromorpha, which contain modern lizards and tuatara.

Unlike its longer "winged" relative Kuehneosuchus (which may be a species of the same genus or represent a different sexual morph), aerodynamic studies have shown that Kuehneosaurus was probably not a glider, but instead used its elongated ribs to parachute from the trees. A study by Stein et al. in 2008 found that its parachuting speed, descending at a 45-degree angle, would be between 10 and 12 metres per second. Pitch was controlled by lappets (wattle-like flaps of skin) on the hyoid apparatus, as in the modern gliding lizard Draco.

See also 

 Coelurosauravus

References

Further reading 
 Robinson PL (1962) Gliding lizards from the Upper Keuper of Great Britain. Proceedings of the Geological Society of London 1601:137–146.
 Robinson PL (1967a) Triassic vertebrates from upland and lowland. Science and Culture 33:169–173.
 Evans SE, Jones MEH (2010) The Origin, early history and diversification of lepidosauromorph reptiles. In Bandyopadhyay S. (ed.), New Aspects of Mesozoic Biodiversity, 27 Lecture Notes in Earth Sciences 132, 27–44. ,

Triassic lepidosauromorphs
Prehistoric reptile genera
Norian life
Late Triassic reptiles of Europe
Triassic England
Fossils of England
Fossils of Luxembourg
Fossil taxa described in 1962